Prionus imbricornis is a longhorn beetle of the genus Prionus.

References

Beetles described in 1767
Taxa named by Carl Linnaeus
Prioninae